Carangas (Oruro) is a small village in Bolivia. In 2010 it had an estimated population of 47.

References

Populated places in Oruro Department